"La Confidence" is a short story by French author Guy de Maupassant, published in 1885.

History
La Confidence is a short story written by Guy de Maupassant. It was first published in the periodical Gil Blas on August 20, 1885, before being reprised in the Monsieur Parent collection.

Synopsis
The marquise of Rennedon tells her friend, the baroness of Grangerie, how she just took revenge on her abominable husband.

Publications
 Gil Blas, 1885
 Monsieur Parent – collection published in 1885 by the editor Paul Ollendorff
 Maupassant, contes et nouvelles, volume II, text established and annotated by Louis Forestier, Bibliothèque de la Pléiade, Éditions Gallimard, 1979

References

External links
 

Short stories by Guy de Maupassant
1885 short stories
Works originally published in Gil Blas (periodical)